The Marit Sveaas Minneløp is a Group 3 flat horse race in Norway open to thoroughbreds aged three years or older. It is run over a distance of 1,800 metres (about 1⅛ miles) at Øvrevoll in August.

History
The event was founded by Christen Sveaas, a Norwegian financier, in 1991. It is named after his mother, Marit, who died that year. The first running had a winner's prize of 89,500 kroner.

The race was given Listed status in 1992, and from this point it offered 200,000 kroner to the winner. Its prize was increased several times thereafter.

The Marit Sveaas Minneløp was promoted to Group 3 level in 2001. It was one of two Norwegian races given Group status that year, along with the Polar Cup.

The winner's prize was raised to 1,000,000 kroner in 2007. It was reduced to 800,000 kroner in 2009. The race currently has the richest first-place prize in Scandinavia.

Records
Most successful horse (2 wins):
 Regal Parade – 1991, 1993
 Valley Chapel – 2000, 2001
 Bank of Burden - 2012, 2014
 Square de Luynes - 2019, 2021

Leading jockey (4 wins):
 Fredrik Johansson – Valley Chapel (2001), Royal Experiment (2003), Funny Legend (2007), Appel au Maitre (2008)

Leading trainer (8 wins):
 Wido Neuroth – Coneybury (1994), Kill the Crab (1996), Valley Chapel (2000, 2001), Royal Experiment (2003), Funny Legend (2007), Appel au Maitre (2008), Touch of Hawk (2010)

Winners

See also
 List of Scandinavian flat horse races

References

 Racing Post:
 horseracingintfed.com – International Federation of Horseracing Authorities – Marit Sveaas Minneløp (2018).
 ovrevoll.no – Marit Sveaas Minneløp.
 pedigreequery.com – Marit Sveaas Minneløp – Øvrevoll.

Open mile category horse races
Sport in Bærum
Horse races in Norway
1991 establishments in Norway
Recurring sporting events established in 1991
Summer events in Norway